Nakhuda is a 1981 Hindi drama film, directed by Dilip Naik and produced by Yash Chopra, starring Raj Kiran,  Swaroop Sampat and Madan Puri in lead roles. Music of film was by Khayyam with lyrics by Nida Fazli.

Plot

Ravi Shankar lives in a shabby hotel room belonging to the owner of the Hotel "Allah Belli", Sheikhu Dada. Ravi studies in college and pays his rent and living expenses through money-orders sent to him from his dad. After Ravi's dad passes away, Sheikhu initially asks him to leave the room, but then decides to pay for the remainder of his education so as to recover all dues when Ravi gets a job. Ravi does get through successfully, and Sheikhu even arranges for a job with a wealthy businessman named Jagannath Gupta. Ravi and Jagannath's daughter, Sonia, fall in love and get married, and soon Sonia gets pregnant. Jagannath and Sonia are unhappy with Sheikhu's involvement with their family, and conspire to put an end to Ravi and Sheikhu's relationship.

Cast 
 Raj Kiran as Ravi Shankar
 Swaroop Sampat as Sonia Gupta
 Madan Puri as Jagannath Gupta
 Javed Khan as Nawab (waiter)
 Kulbhushan Kharbanda as Sheikhu Dada
 Mac Mohan as Anthony
 Yunus Parvez as Qawwali singer
 Jagdish Raj as Police inspector
 Asha Sachdev as Courtesan

Music
"Tujhe Maroongi Phoolon Ki Maar Sajna" - Mahendra Kapoor, Asha Bhosle
"Haq Ali, Ali Maula Ali" - Nusrat Fateh Ali Khan, Mujahad Ali
"Suno Ik Baat Bolein, Hamein Tumse Mohabbat Hai" - Nitin Mukesh, Lata Mangeshkar
"Aaja Aaja Yaar Habibi" - Pamela Chopra, S K Mohan, Jagjeet Kaur, Mahendra Kapoor
"Sahara Hai Nakhuda Ka" - Mahendra Kapoor
"Tumhari Palko Ki Chilmano Me Ye Kya Chhupa Hai" - Lata Mangeshkar, Nitin Mukesh

References

External links 
 
 

1981 films
Yash Raj Films films
1980s Hindi-language films
Films scored by Khayyam